Marie Smith is a former international lawn bowler from Guernsey.

Bowls career
Smith won a silver medal in the Women's pairs at the 1986 Commonwealth Games in Edinburgh with Jenny Nicolle.

References

English female bowls players
Living people
Commonwealth Games medallists in lawn bowls
Commonwealth Games silver medallists for Guernsey
Bowls players at the 1986 Commonwealth Games
Year of birth missing (living people)
Medallists at the 1986 Commonwealth Games